Dr. James W. Chesebro (June 24, 1944 - January 21, 2020) was Distinguished Professor of Telecommunications in the Department of Telecommunications at Ball State University. He received his Ph.D. from the University of Minnesota in 1972.

Previous educational institutions
Chesebro taught at several institutions, including:
 Indiana State University
 North Dakota State University
 Ball State University
 George Mason University
 Queens College of the City University of New York
 University of Puerto Rico
 Temple University
 University of Minnesota
 Concordia College

Specialization
In the discipline of communication, Chesebro specialized in the study of media as symbolic and cognitive systems. From 1966, he maintained a sustained focus on dramatistic theory, methods and criticism with specific applications to television and computer-mediated communication. From 1981, this orientation was extended to all media systems, with conceptual attention devoted to media literacy and media technologies as communication and cognitive systems, a perspective reflected in both his teaching and research.

Professional service
 President of the Eastern Communication Association (1982-1983)
 Editor of Communication Quarterly (1985-1987)
 Chair of the NCA.s Publications Board (1986-1988)
 Director of Education Services, National Office of the National Communication Association, July 1989 to July 1992
 President of the National Communication Association (1996)
 Editor of the NCA journal Critical Studies in Media Communication (1999-2001)
 Editor of the National Communication Association (NCA) online journal Review of Communication (2004-2006)

Books
Chesebro published several books, including
 Public Policy Decision-Making: Systems Analysis and Comparative Advantages Debate (Harper & Row, 1973)
 Orientations to Public Communication (Science Research Associates, 1976)
 Gayspeak: Gay Male and Lesbian Communication (Pilgrim Press, 1981)
 Computer-Mediated Communication: Human Relationships in a Computerized World (University of Alabama Press, 1989)
 Analyzing Media:  Communication Technologies as Symbolic and Cognitive Systems (Guilford Press, 1996)
 Extensions of the Burkeian System (University of Alabama Press, 2006)
 Methods of Rhetorical Criticism:  A Twentieth-Century Perspective (Roxbury, 2007)
 A Century of Transformation: Studies in the Honor of the 100th Anniversary of the ECA (Oxford University Press, 2009)
 Communicating Gender and Power (Waveland Press, 2011)

Articles
Chesebro published over 100 articles in communication journals such as the Quarterly Journal of Speech, Critical Studies in Mass Communication, Communication Monographs, Communication Education and Text and Performance Quarterly as well as the Journal of Popular Culture and the computer science journal Intel's Innovator.

Awards

1985
 NCA's Golden Anniversary Award for the outstanding monograph of  the year.

1997
 NCA's Samuel L. Becker Distinguished Service Award

2001
 Robert J. Kibler Memorial Award for "demonstrated dedicated to excellence, commitment to the profession, concern for others, visions of what could be, acceptance of diversity, and forthrightness"

Other awards
The Eastern Communication Association presented him with its most prestigious awards including its Everett Lee Hunt Scholarship Award in 1989 and again in 1997, identified him one its Distinguished Research Fellows in 1996 and Distinguished Teaching Fellows in 1998. In 1993, he received the National Kenneth Burke Society's Distinguished Service Award and its National Kenneth Burke Society's Life-Time Achievement Award 1999. At Indiana State University, he was awarded the President's Medal for "exemplary performance as a faculty member" in 1999 and was identified as the 2001 Distinguished Professor of the College of Arts and Sciences.

References

External links
Personal website

University of Minnesota alumni
Indiana State University faculty
North Dakota State University faculty
George Mason University faculty
Temple University faculty
Queens College, City University of New York faculty
Ball State University faculty
Communication theorists
1944 births
2020 deaths